Ekne is a village in the municipality of Levanger in Trøndelag county, Norway. The lakes Sønningen and Byavatnet lie south of the village. Ekne Church is located in this village. The World War II-era Falstad concentration camp was also located here.

References

Villages in Trøndelag
Levanger